Saúl Leslie (born 3 March 1964) is a Panamanian wrestler. He competed in the men's freestyle 57 kg at the 1984 Summer Olympics.

References

1964 births
Living people
Panamanian male sport wrestlers
Olympic wrestlers of Panama
Wrestlers at the 1984 Summer Olympics
Place of birth missing (living people)